The Yungkurara were an indigenous Australian people of the state of Queensland.

Country
Norman Tindale estimated Yungkjurara lands as occupying  around the Bloomfield River. They were the indigenous people of Weary Bay. Their southern limits were at Cape Kimberley. They were also present in the area of Spring Vale.

Social organization
The names of at least two hordes are known:-{{efn|Tindale's source mentions these two among a list of several Weary Bay tribes:'Boolpoonnarra, Koonara, Wolburra, Moolburra, Moo-arra, Yokarra, Ikkarra, Yekkara, Amaggi, and Gengagi.}}

 Bulponara YokarraAlternative names
 Yungkarara Junkara Koko Dyungay Yungurara Yung-Kurara Koko-aungu Kokodjilandji Kokojalanja Kokoyalunyu Koko Ialunia Koko Ialiu Bulponara, Bulpoonarra YokarraSome words
 kai'a. tame dog
 nundin. (father)
 nammo. (mother)
 wangar.''  (whiteman)

Notes

Citations

Sources

Aboriginal peoples of Queensland